Igor Sadykov (born 23 July 1967 in Osh) is a Soviet and German male former weightlifter, who competed in the first heavyweight class. He represented the Soviet Union until 1992 and Germany from 1993 at international competitions. He won the gold medal at the 1991 World Weightlifting Championships after winning silver at the 1990 World Weightlifting Championships. For Germany he won the bronze medal at the 1993 World Weightlifting Championships He participated at the 1996 Summer Olympics in the 99 kg event. He won the gold medal at the 1991 European Championships in the Sub-Heavyweight.

References

1967 births
Living people
Soviet male weightlifters
German male weightlifters
World Weightlifting Championships medalists
People from Osh
Olympic weightlifters of Germany
Weightlifters at the 1996 Summer Olympics